The 2003 CONCACAF Champions' Cup was the 38th edition of the annual international club football competition held in the CONCACAF region (North America, Central America and the Caribbean), the CONCACAF Champions' Cup. It was won by Club Toluca after a 5–4 aggregate win over countryfellow club Morelia in the final. The tournament was held between March 6 and October 8. The 16-team format was scrapped for an eight-team format in 2004.

Qualified teams

North American zone
 Club Toluca - 2002 Apertura champion
 Morelia - 2002 Apertura runner-up
 Club América - 2002 Verano champion
 Club Necaxa - 2002 Verano runner-up
 Los Angeles Galaxy - 2002 MLS Cup champion and 2002 MLS Supporters Shield winner
 New England Revolution - 2002 MLS Cup runner-up
 San Jose Earthquakes - 2002 MLS Supporters Shield runner-up
 Columbus Crew - 2002 Lamar Hunt U.S. Open Cup winner

Central American zone
 Alajuelense - 2002 UNCAF Interclub Cup winner
 Árabe Unido - 2002 UNCAF Interclub Cup runner-up
 Motagua - 2002 UNCAF Interclub Cup third place
 Comunicaciones - 2002 UNCAF Interclub Cup fourth place
 Municipal - 2002 UNCAF Interclub Cup semifinal runner-up
 FAS - 2002 UNCAF Interclub Cup semifinal runner-up

Caribbean zone
 W Connection - 2002 CFU Club Championship finalist
 Arnett Gardens - 2002 CFU Club Championship finalist

Bracket

Round of 16

Quarterfinals

Semifinals

 Morelia advanced 6–0 on aggregate.
 Toluca advanced 5–4 on aggregate.

Final

First leg

Second leg 

Toluca won 3–1 on points (5–4 on aggregate).

Champions

Top scorers

References

CONCACAF Champions' Cup
1
c